The Audi RS 2 Avant was a limited edition, high-performance Audi Avant (Audi marketing for a station wagon / estate car), manufactured from March 1994 to July 1995.  Collaboratively designed as a joint venture between Audi AG and Porsche and built on Audi's 80 Avant, designated internally as P1 (instead of B4/8C that it was based on). It featured the most powerful version of Audi's inline-five cylinder turbocharged engine. It represents Audi's first "RS" model, and the first of their high-performance Avants.

It was not widely exported outside of Europe, except in limited quantity to Hong Kong, South Africa, Brazil, and New Zealand. However, the RS 2 has amassed a cult following worldwide including Canada and the United States where the RS 2 was not officially imported due to certification costs and weak brand performance in the early 1990s. RS 2s have now been imported to Canada and USA as both allow non-conforming vehicles to be imported once they reach the age of 15 and 25 years respectively.

Overview

The RS 2 was the product of a co-development project between Audi and Porsche, based on Audi's 80 Avant, and built on the Audi B4 platform. It was powered by a modified version of their  inline-five DOHC four valves per cylinder (20 valves total) turbocharged petrol engine (parts code prefix: 034, identification code: ADU). Although much of the car's underpinnings were manufactured by Audi, assembly was handled by Porsche at their Rossle-Bau plant in Zuffenhausen, Germany, which had become available after discontinuation of the Mercedes-Benz 500E, which Porsche had manufactured there under contract. The Rossle-Bau plant also produced the famous Porsche 959.

Like the rest of the vehicle, the RS 2's five-cylinder engine was based on a unit that Audi already produced, although Porsche considerably modified the engine; the standard KK&K turbocharger was switched for a larger unit, along with a heavy-duty intercooler and higher flow fuel injectors, a newly designed camshaft, a more efficient induction system, and a low-pressure exhaust system replaced the standard fare; a specially modified URS4/URS6 Bosch-supplied engine control unit (ECU) controlled the engine.

Even by more modern standards, its performance is exceptional; it could accelerate on-par with the 5th generation Chevrolet Corvette (C5) and a 996 generation Porsche 911.

A six-speed manual gearbox (parts code prefix: 01E, identification code: CRB) (gear ratios - 1st: 3.500, 2nd: 1.889, 3rd: 1.320, 4th: 1.034, 5th: 0.857, 6th: 0.711) was the only transmission choice. Audi's Torsen-based 'trademark' quattro permanent four-wheel drive system was standard. Front and rear final drive units contained a conventional 'open' differential, and have a ratio of 4.111, although the rear (parts code prefix: 01H, identification code: AZE) also has an electro-mechanical diff lock.

Porsche-designed braking and suspension systems replaced the standard Audi 80 equipment, however, the Bosch Anti-lock braking system (ABS) was retained. The rears featured  by  radially vented discs, again with Brembo four-piston calipers, and the 'modified' option included identical sized discs, but merely included cross-drilling, along with uprated pads. The hand brake worked on the rears, and consisted of a cable operated 'drum in disc' system.

 lower than a standard 80 Avant, the suspension and braking upgrades combined to give the RS 2 the handling and braking capabilities of a high-end sports car; 7.0Jx17 inch Porsche 'Cup' wheels, and high-performance 245/40 ZR17 Dunlop tyres were standard as well. In fact, the braking system wore Porsche-badged Brembo calipers, and both the wheels and side mirrors were identical in design to those of the 964 Turbo. Additionally, the word "PORSCHE" is inscribed in the RS 2 emblem affixed to the rear tailgate and front grille.

A three-spoke leather steering wheel, Recaro sports-bucket seats (available in full leather or a leather/suede combination), and console materials in either wood or carbon fiber trim rounded out the vehicle's interior changes. Audi's proprietary Safety Restraint System, procon-ten remained from its donor vehicle.

Audi also produced an S2, which was available both as an Avant (estate) and a Coupé, as well as saloon model with only 306 examples built.

See also

Audi S and RS models

References

External links
Audi.com Audi corporate website

Cars introduced in 1994
RS2
Porsche
All-wheel-drive vehicles
Executive cars
Mid-size cars
Sports cars
Station wagons